The Nowy Sącz Ghetto known in German as Ghetto von Neu-Sandez and in Yiddish as צאנז (Tsanz; Zanc) or נײ-סאנץ (Nay-Sants; Nojzanc) was a World War II ghetto set up by Nazi Germany for the purpose of persecution and exploitation of Polish Jews in the city of Nowy Sącz  during the occupation of Poland (1939–45).

The relocation of Jews continued ever since the German army rolled into Nowy Sącz on 6 September 1939 in the first week of the invasion of Poland. Synagogues and prayer houses were devastated and turned into storehouses. The Ghetto was filled with 18,000 prisoners from the city and all neighbouring settlements and closed off from the outside officially in June 1941. It was liquidated one year later with all Jewish men, women and children rounded up and sent aboard Holocaust trains to Bełżec extermination camp in late August 1942.

Background 
According to records, historic Nowy Sącz was populated by the Jews at least since 1469. Throughout centuries Jews contributed greatly to the town's overall economy. Most Jewish families lived in the Zakamienica neighbourhood by the Kamienica river. The first brick-and-mortar synagogue was built at Nowy Sącz in 1699, tax-exempt. Nowy Sącz was an influential centre of Hasidic Judaism and the Zionist movement dating back to the 19th century. Some 30% of the total population of 34,000 residents of Nowy Sącz were Jewish before the German-Soviet invasion of Poland in 1939. In the city centre 90% of tenement houses were owned by Jews.

On 6 September 1939 the Germans took over Nowy Sącz and renamed it Neu-Sandez. The command of the city was given to SS-Obersturmführer Heinrich Hamann (de) (pl) from the Gestapo. Nowy Sącz became the seat of Kreis Neu-Sandez in Distrikt Krakau of the General Government, in line with the Nazi-Soviet pact against Poland. The persecution of Jews began soon thereafter. The new German administration ordered all Jewish businesses closed pending confiscation proceedings. In the spring of 1940 the Judenrat was formed on German orders. The first mass execution of Jews and Poles took place in May 1940, in the course of the German AB-Aktion in Poland. The city block surrounding the German office of Sicherheitspolizei was cleared of all so-called undesirables. Nearly 1,000 people were murdered.

Ghetto history 
Dispossessed Jews were resettled to Nowy Sącz in several major deportation actions from the neighbouring towns of Muszyna, Krynica (1,000–1,200), Piwniczna, but also from Łódź, Sieradz, Kraków, Lwów and Bielsko. The ghetto formation was pronounced by Hamann in June 1941 at which time a 2–3 metre wall was erected along its perimeter, although the ghetto zone existed already since 12 July 1940. It consisted of two interconnected parts of the city centre, both very small. One of them, around Kazimierza Wielkiego Street by the castle, and the second one on the other side of the river, in the so-called Piekło neighbourhood across the Lwowska Street bridge. Some 12,000 Jews were forced to relocate there. In the following months, more Jews were resettled to Nowy Sącz from the General Government and territories of Poland annexed by Nazi Germany; forced by the SS to subsist on little to nothing in extremely overcrowded conditions. Often 20 people were assigned to one room. The Ghetto was entirely dependent on the German authorities for food. Starvation rations were introduced. In the fall of 1941, some 30 Jews where caught and executed following failed escape attempt across the border to the Soviet occupied eastern part of Poland. The total number of Jews in the ghetto grew to 18,000.

A number of forced labour camps were set up in the vicinity of Nowy Sącz for the able-bodied prisoners, including the camp in Rożnów (improperly, Różanów) as well as camps in Stary Sącz, Chełmiec, Rytro, and Lipie. Several hundred men were sent to Rabka. All Jewish slave labour was housed at the Zakamienica ghetto located between the river bank and the streets of Zdrojowa (to the north), Hallera, Barska, and Lwowska (to the south). In total, 2,500 Jews were sent away. A system of gradually escalating terror was introduced with publicly announced executions. About 200 men were murdered for alleged Zionist activities, another 70 men were shot for alleged cigarette-smuggling, both within two days of each other.

During the German Operation Reinhard which marked the deadliest phase of the Holocaust, from 23 August 1942 the final ghetto liquidation action took place over a three-day period, under the guise of "resettlement in the East" (Umsiedlung). Prior to that, families with the elderly, and the sick, were ordered to relocate to the ghetto at Kazimierza Wielkiego Street. Most of those unable to leave home for the trains at an instance, were shot point blank by Ordnungspolizei during early morning roundups. The long column of Jewish prisoners, gathered for deportation, were led to an open field by the river, not far from the rail bridge across Dunajec. They were ordered to bring travel food, light luggage, and keys to their homes, because they would be transferred to labour camps in Reichskommissariat Ukraine. During a selection, approximately 750 young males were taken to be sent to labour camps in nearby Muszyna, Rożnów, and Sędziszów Małopolski. All other Jews, estimated at at least 15,000 were kept on the river bank overnight, and taken in three Holocaust transports to the Bełżec death camp at 25–28 August 1942. The Neu-Sandez (Nowy Sącz) Ghetto was no more.

The commandant of the city and head of the Neu-Sandez SD, SS-Obersturmführer Heinrich Hamann from the Gestapo, who had killed dozens of Jews with his own hands during the ghetto existence and its murderous liquidation, went on to live normal life in West Germany after World War II. He was arrested twenty years after the fact by the German authorities, and in 1962 put on trial at Bochum, along with 14 members of his department for complicity in the murder of 17,000 Polish Jews from Neu-Sandez. Hamann was charged with 76 cases of murder based on witness testimony, and received a life sentence.

Holocaust rescue 
One of the most far-reaching rescue missions in Nowy Sącz was conducted by Anna Sokołowska née Hadziacka, a Catholic high school teacher who run a safe-house in her apartment at Szujskiego 10 Street for Jewish students. She procured false documents for them, bought food, clothing, medicine, harboured the sick, found Polish families for Jewish children, and delivered the ghetto correspondence. She was caught by Gestapo with two Jewish women in her house, and sent to Ravensbrück where she was killed with a phenol injection according to one account. The Jewish survivors remembered her; Sokołowska was bestowed the title of Righteous in 1989.

One day ahead of the ghetto liquidation, the Jewish family of Emil and Sala Steinlauf with their four children: Lola, Leon, Róża (Rosa), and Janina, managed to escape. They knew Zenobia and Piotr Król family (pictured) with their seven children, from before the war; the Steinlaufs helped the Króls survive the winter of 1939. In gratitude, Zenobia and Piotr brought food to the ghetto for their friends illegally, against strict Nazi orders which forbade this under penalty of death. Upon Steinlaufs successful flight from the deportation to Belzec, the Króls arranged a secret living space for them in the attic for the following three years. Their children used to play together while in hiding; between 15 August 1942 and 30 January 1945. All survived. The Steinlaufs emigrated to Israel after the war ended, but both families remained in contact. Nine members of the Król family were awarded the titles of the Righteous in January 1982, thanks to the Steinlaufs' surviving children.

During the ghetto liquidation action, two Jewish sisters Helena (Lena) and Genowefa Brandel-Buchbinder (age 23 and 29 respectively) escaped dressed as farm girls. Their brothers Kazimierz (age 24) and Władysław escaped from the slave labour camp in Chełmiec, to join them. They found refuge at the distant home of the Sikoń family of the Polish Righteous. Both, the rescuers and the rescued had little to eat. The Sikoń children stole food from the neighbouring farms to feed them all. Genowefa died in March 1943 from tuberculosis. Everybody else survived the war. Zofia Sikoń died in 1971; the Sikoń children, Stanisław and Anna, were bestowed the titles of the Righteous in May 2000.

Jewish doctor, Juliusz Hellereich (Bernard Ingram) and his Polish fiancé Irena found shelter at the small apartment of Polish Righteous, Marian Gołębiowski, lawyer by profession residing in Nowy Sącz for the war. In search of safe hideaways, Gołębiowski travelled with them under false names as the Jakobiszyn couple to other locations. All three stayed together until the end of the occupation and survived while helping other people as well. Gołębiowski was honoured by Yad Vashem in 1989 at the age of 90. Stefan Kiełbasa (age 18), living in Nowy Sącz, was shot with one of his Christian friends in 1942 by the Gestapo for supplying Jews with forged "Aryan" identity documents. Stanisław Adamczyk from Nowy Sącz county was beaten to death by the Germans in the spring of 1943 for sheltering a single Jew. Another Christian Pole from Nowy Sącz county, physician Józef Pietrzykowski, was arrested and executed in winter of 1942 for providing medical help to a sick Jewish child.

See also 
 Jewish ghettos in German-occupied Poland
 The Holocaust in occupied Poland
 Nazi crimes against the Polish nation

References

Further reading 
 Anna Dominik, Pedagogical University of Kraków (24 April 2014), Świeczka dla 480 ofiar masakry (Candle for the 480 victims of a massacre) Twój Sącz online. 
 Geoffrey P. Megargee (2009), The United States Holocaust Memorial Museum Encyclopedia of Camps and Ghettos, 1933–1945. Indiana University Press, .

External links 

 

Jewish ghettos in Nazi-occupied Poland
Nowy Sącz